Technical Difficulties was a Filk group composed of Sheila Willis, Linda Melnick and T.J. Burnside (now T.J. Burnside Clapp).  They won The Pegasus Award ("For Excellence In Filking") in the Best Performer category at the Ohio Valley Filk Fest convention in 1989, and produced two albums on cassette, Please Stand By and Station Break.

Albums

Please Stand By

Side 1 
 Lullaby for a Weary World
 Reluctant Freedom
 Elizabeth's Song
 Come You Knights
 Innocence Lost
 Dedication

Side 2 
 Technical Difficulties, Part I: Dona Nobis Pacem
 One Final Lesson
 Break Forth
 Few Days
 Thinking of You / The Cruel War
 Technical Difficulties, Part II: The Hallelujah Chorus

Station Break

Side 1 
Star Sisters
Ladyhawke!
Go, Traveller
Dairy Queen
Robin Hood
Arafel's Song

Side 1 
Wolf and Hawk
Challenge
Wishful Thinking
Jaq's Song
Dreamer's Lament
Technical Difficulties, Part III: Pachalbel's Canon in G

External links
Biography

Filkers